Eshkaft Shah-e Sofla (also Romanized as Eshkaft Shāh-e Soflá; also known as Eshkaft Shāh-e Pā’īn) is a village in Kuh Mareh Khami Rural District, in the Central District of Basht County, Kohgiluyeh and Boyer-Ahmad Province, Iran. At the 2006 census, its population was 61, in 16 families.

References 

Populated places in Basht County